Lecithocera laminospina is a moth in the family Lecithoceridae. It was described by Chun-Sheng Wu and Kyu-Tek Park in 1999. It is found in Sri Lanka.

The wingspan is about 10 mm. The forewings are reddish brown, with the outer fascia dark reddish brown and indistinct. The hindwings are brown.

Etymology
The species name is derived from Latin lamina (meaning plate) and spina (meaning spine).

References

Moths described in 1999
laminospina
Moths of Sri Lanka